Owain Glyndŵr  (c. 1359 – c. 1416) was a Welsh nobleman, whose name is sometimes Anglicised as Owen Glendower.

Owen Glendower or Owain Glyndŵr may also refer to:

Owen Glendower (Shakespeare character), in William Shakespeare's play Henry IV, Part One
Owen Glendower (novel), by John Cowper Powys
HMS Owen Glendower (1808), a British warship
Owain Glyndŵr, a locomotive on the Vale of Rheidol Railway

See also
Glendower (disambiguation)